This is a list of adult fiction books that topped The New York Times Fiction Best Seller list in 1977.

See also

 1977 in literature
 New York Times Nonfiction Best Sellers of 1977
 Lists of The New York Times Fiction Best Sellers
 Publishers Weekly list of bestselling novels in the United States in the 1970s

References

1977
.
1977 in the United States